Polanco is a Spanish name shared by people and places in Mexico, Spain and other countries, including:

Places
 Polanco, Mexico City, an upscale neighborhood of Mexico City
Polanco metro station, a station of the Mexico City Metro that serves the Polanco neighborhood
 Polanco, Spain, a municipality in Spain
 Polanco, Zamboanga del Norte, a municipality in the Philippines
Polanco Hill in Valparaiso, Chile, site of the Polanco Lift
San Gregorio de Polanco, a city in Uruguay

People
 Polanco (surname) Includes list of people with the name